Glenboig (Scottish Gaelic: An Gleann Bhog) is a village in North Lanarkshire, Scotland lying north of Coatbridge and to the south east of Kirkintilloch and is approximately  from  Glasgow City Centre.

Historically the settlement formed the south eastern extremity of the ancient Gaelic province of the Lennox (Scottish Gaelic: An Leamhnachd) which lay roughly within the former county of Dunbartonshire. The etymology of the name is uncertain but may mean "boggy or soft glen". Some online maps refer to the area as Marnock but locals call the area Glenboig.

Glenboig's main industry was fireclay and Glenboig's name was known across the world.

History 

Glenboig's main industry was fireclay, centred on the General Refractories and Glenboig Union Fireclay Company Limited's Star Fireclay Works, which made refractory products for the steel and iron industries. Aerial photographs of the works are available. The Glenboig Union Fire-clay Company Limited dates back to 1836.

Glenboig's only railway station closed in 1956. The closest is now . Glenboig's brick making industries ceased after the closure of the last brickworks, P&M (Peter & Mark) Hurll's in July 1980.

The village's first school was built between 1875 and 1876; it has since been replaced.

Bedlay Colliery (1905-1981)

Bedlay was a two shaft coal "pit"; one shaft had modern enclosed headgear while the other was of an older type. It was opened in 1905. On 11 December 1981, Bedlay Colliery in the nearby village of Annathill  was closed.

In 2009 Glenboig Village Park was completely rebuilt after several million pounds of funding from The National Lottery dramatically increasing its size and including state of the art equipment.

Demographics

Historically the name of the settlement has changed. Before the brickworks the settlement was Garnqueen.

Glenboig today

In recent years the village has grown, with the addition of two new Redrow and Barrat housing estates in the early to mid part of the 2000s. The village used to have two pubs - 'The Big Shop' and 'The Village Inn' formerly known as 'The Garnqueen' (after the neighbouring Loch) but colloquially among locals known as 'The Wee Shop' which closed circa 2009, and subsequently, became derelict.

Glenboig also has a post office, hair salon, beauty salon, newsagents, a Chinese food takeaway, Indian food takeaway, a fish and chip shop, and a Londis store.

Within the community there are many small businesses including a flower arrangers, architectural design service and mortgage brokers and professional tree surgeons.

In 2015, a new road was authorised between Glenboig and Gartcosh on the other side of the M73 motorway, as part of a 'community growth area' expansion involving new business units (alongside the existing Police Scotland Scottish Crime Campus facility) and 3000 houses across the development zone, also encompassing land near the village of Mount Ellen north of Gartcosh.

In 2021, work begun on a new housing development site called Meadowside.

In popular culture
 Glenboig Clayworks (1935) B&W 7 mins silent by Alexander McKendrik, shows clay being mined and firebricks being moulded
 Coronation Celebrations at Glenboig (1953) colour seven mins silent by Alexander McKendrik

See also
List of places in North Lanarkshire
List of places in Scotland

Notes

External links

 Coatbridge Museum
 Information on the village and the local church

Villages in North Lanarkshire
Greater Glasgow